A calypter is either of two posterior lobes of the posterior margin of the forewing of flies between the extreme posterior wing base and the alula, which covers the halteres.

The lower calypter is the proximal calypter (synonyms: squama (of some authors), tegula) and the upper calypter is the distal calypter (synonym: squamula).

Species of the subsection Acalyptratae are noted for lacking calypters.

References

 James Francis McAlpine. Morphology and Terminology - Adults. In: J.F. McAlpine, B.V. Peterson, G.E. Shewell, H.J. Teskey, J.R. Vockeroth, D.M. Wood (a cura di) Manual of Nearctic Diptera, Volume 1. Research Branch, Agriculture Canada, Monograph 27, 1981: 9-64. . (In inglese).
 Bernhard Merz, Jean-Paul Haenni. Morphology and terminology of adult Diptera (other than terminalia). In: László Papp, Béla Darvas (a cura di) Manual of Palaearctic Diptera. Volume 1: General and Applied Dipterology. Budapest, Science Herald, 2000: 22–51. . (In inglese).
 Ermenegildo Tremblay. Entomologia applicata. Volume III Parte I. 1ª ed. Napoli, Liguori Editore, 1991. .

Calyptratae
Fly biology
Insect anatomy